Who Built the Moon? is the third studio album by English rock band Noel Gallagher's High Flying Birds. Produced by David Holmes, it was released on 24 November 2017, through Gallagher's label Sour Mash Records. Four singles were released from the album; "Holy Mountain", "It's a Beautiful World", "She Taught Me How to Fly" and "If Love Is the Law". 

The album received generally positive reviews from critics, who praised the album's psychedelic experimentation and progression from the band's previous albums. It was also a commercial success, becoming Gallagher's 10th consecutive UK No.1 album with both the band and Oasis, becoming the first artist to reach the landmark of 10 consecutive UK No.1 albums.

Background
Who Built the Moon? was a work in progress since Chasing Yesterday was being recorded, Noel has stated in interviews that this album was being recorded not only during those sessions but also during the Chasing Yesterday World Tour. The album was announced on 25 September 2017 through Gallagher's social media accounts, with the upcoming 2018 UK and Ireland tour. In an interview with Colombian DJ Alejandro Marín, Gallagher revealed that the woman on the album's cover is his wife Sara MacDonald. This is the final album to feature the drummer Jeremy Stacey, who was departed from the band in 2016 during the recording to supporting the tour of King Crimson. He was temporarily replaced by Emre Ramazanoglu to continue the recording.

Singles
On 9 October 2017, the song "Holy Mountain" was released as the first single. The single contained the B-side "Dead in the Water", which has become one of the band's signature themes since the album's release. On 17 November 2017, "It's a Beautiful World" was released as the second single from the album, it contained the B-side "God Help Us All", a demo recorded over a decade earlier from when Oasis were still together. On 6 April 2018, "She Taught Me How to Fly" was announced as the third single from the album, and released on 25 May with a coinciding music video. The single was the only track from the album released as a single to not contain an original lyrical song, instead a remix by frequent collaborator of Gallagher, Justin Robertson. "If Love Is the Law" was the 4th single to be released from the album on 17 August 2018, with the last B-side to be released as "Alone On The Rope".

Critical reception

Who Built the Moon? received acclaim from music critics. On Metacritic, which assigns a normalised rating out of 100 to reviews from mainstream critics, the album received an average score of 76 based on 20 reviews, indicating "generally favorable reviews". Many reviews praised the album's experimentation and its progression from the typical sound of Gallagher's previous works.

Stephen Thomas Erlewine of AllMusic gave the album a very positive review, noting that "There is a certain rush hearing him opt for glam, psychedelia, and candied pop instead of respectable strumming. Once that initial rush fades, the album is still satisfying due to its impeccable execution. Noel knows how to construct a sturdy song and Holmes knows how to dress them up in flashy clothes, and the combination results in Gallagher's best album since splitting up Oasis." The Times gave the album a positive four-star review, saying "This sounds like the work of a man who has been micro-dosing LSD. And listening to a lot of Chemical Brothers and Primal Scream albums while he's at it. This isn't a groundbreaking epic, but more for middle-aged mods — brimming with cool references and psychedelic on a modest level." The Guardian wrote that "The third record from Noel Gallagher's solo outfit is, according to the ex-Oasis man, merely him in 'more colourful clothes'. Brightness is certainly the first thing that strikes you about Who Built the Moon, an album that cloaks Gallagher's hardy guitar-pop in glowing Smithsian riffs, tin whistle samples from novelty 60s tunes and a heady fug of riotous glam rock. Particular highlights include the gloriously Slade-esque Holy Mountain and the singalong-friendly Black and White Sunshine, which resembles Oasis basking on a sun lounger. Even the fact that the album regularly recalls some of the duller post-Britpop bands – It's a Beautiful World is basically an Elbow track backed by a breakbeat – can't dampen the joy that rings out from every corner. Producer David Holmes may be responsible for Noel's change of pace, but the vibrancy and strains of psychedelia never feel like intruders: instead, they act as the perfect foil for the record’s blissed-out lyrics about life-changing love."

The A.V. Club were mixed in their C+ review, saying: "Whereas his brother Liam turned a bit inward on his recent solo debut, Noel Gallagher, unsurprisingly, is doing the opposite. His third solo album with the High Flying Birds, Who Built The Moon?, turns everything up to 11, hardly ever dropping down to add a necessary level of drama, or even basic tension. It's like an extremely amped-up version of Oasis, but the excesses sway from impressive to taxing. Often the effort to be interesting just comes off as nonsensical cacophony, like the alarm-clock ring in 'Fort Knox' or the French dialogue at the end of 'It's A Beautiful World.' Although Gallagher can still capture the hooks that elude lesser songwriters, they nearly get lost in his orchestral overages. 'Black & White Sunshine' seems to have at least three superlative songs in it, while 'If Love Is The Law' piles on sleigh bells, harmonica, and strings to its plaintive romantic plea, which can barely be heard by the time the chorus crescendos. Bonus track 'Dead In The Water' offers Gallagher's sentimental vocals with just acoustic guitar and piano, and underlines what's so off about the rest of the album: He may be having fun layering a multitude of tracks in the studio, but the truth is he doesn't need them."

In July, the album was nominated for the 2018 Mercury Prize, Gallagher's first placing on the award's shortlist since Oasis' (What's the Story) Morning Glory? in 1995.

Commercial performance
Who Built the Moon? debuted at number one on the UK Albums Chart with 78,000 album-equivalent units, making it Gallagher's 10th consecutive number one studio album, as part of both Oasis and Noel Gallagher's High Flying Birds.

Track listing

Personnel

Noel Gallagher's High Flying Birds 
 Noel Gallagher – guitars and vocals
 Jason Falkner – bass guitar 
 Jeremy Stacey – drums 
 Keefus Ciancia – keyboards

Additional musicians
 Paul Weller – organ 
 Johnny Marr – guitar and harmonica 
 Samuel Dixon – bass guitar 
 Emre Ramazanoglu – drums , programming 
 Pete Lockett – percussion 
 Mike Rowe – keyboards 
 Martin Slattery – tin whistle and piano 
 Kaidi Tathum – keyboards 
 David Holmes – keyboards , programming , tape loops 
 Charlotte Courbe aka Le Volume Courbe – French spoken word 
 Jim Hunt – saxophone 
 James SK Wān – Rhodes 
 Dominic Glover – trumpet 
 Gabe Noel – cello 
 Rob Lewis – cello 
 Emma Smith and Vince Sipprell – strings 

Backing vocalists
 Adelaide McKenzie
 Beverley Skeete
 Sara-Jane Skeete
 Mary Pearce
 YSÉE aka Audrey Gbaguidi
 Michelle John
 Janet Ramus
 Una McGeogh
 Georgina McGeogh

Production 
 David Holmes – production 
 Emre Ramazanoglu – mixing and engineering 
 Tristin Norwell – additional engineering
 Paul "Strangeboy" Stacey – lead vocal recording
 John Davis – mastering

Design
 Gareth Halliday – artwork
 Sara Macdonald – artwork cover model
 David Newton – cover model photography
 Matthew Cooper – design
 Lawrence Watson – booklet photography

Charts

Weekly charts

Year-end charts

Certifications

References

External links
 

2017 albums
Noel Gallagher's High Flying Birds albums